Khimik-SKA Novopolotsk  is an ice hockey team in Novopolotsk, Belarus. The team competes in the Belarusian Extraliga (BXL).

Achievements
Belarusian Extraliga champion (2): 1996, 1997.

External links
Official website

Ice hockey teams in Belarus
Belarusian Extraleague teams